Salim Baba is a 2007 American short documentary film directed by Tim Sternberg. It was nominated for an Academy Award for Best Documentary Short.

Content
The film follows Salim Muhammad, a 55-year-old man who lives in Kolkata with his wife and children. Since the age of ten he has supported himself by screening discarded film scraps for area children. He uses a hand-cranked projector that he inherited from his father. A businessman as well as a cinephile, Salim runs his projector with his sons. He hopes that they will carry on this tradition.

Production

Salim Baba was co-produced by Ropa Vieja Films and Paradox Smoke Productions, with a grant from the Urban Arts Initiative and financial support from the Independent Feature Project. The film was presented as part of Maryland Film Festival's Opening Night shorts program on the evening of May 1, 2008.

References

External links

Salim Baba at Ropa Vieja Films 
Watch Salim Baba at Aeon

2007 films
2007 short documentary films
2007 independent films
American short documentary films
American independent films
2000s Bengali-language films
Films set in Kolkata
Documentary films about the cinema of India
Culture of Kolkata
Films produced by Scott Mosier
2000s American films